The 1995 Citizen Cup was the defender selection series regatta for the 1995 America's Cup, held in the United States. Three defense syndicates (featuring four IACC yachts) competed over four round robins and a semi-finals series in order earn a berth in the Citizen Cup finals; the winner earned the right to defend the America's Cup against the winner of the Louis Vuitton Cup (challenger selection series regatta).

The 1995 Citizen Cup featured the first all female crew aboard Mighty Mary of the America3 Foundation syndicate, defender of both the Citizen Cup and America's Cup.

Teams

America3
Bill Koch's 1995 entry was an all women's program. When it was first announced in March 1994 the team attracted over 600 applicants. The team sailed the 1992 boat America3 (USA–23) before the arrival of Mighty Mary (USA–43) in time for the fourth round robin. Tactician Dave Dellenbaugh joined the crew for the final round robin. Dawn Riley was captain of the team which included J. J. Isler and Leslie Egnot.

Team Dennis Conner
Team Dennis Conner sailed Stars & Stripes (USA–34) during the challenger series, which many judges considered to be the slowest of the three 1995 defenders. During the semi finals USA–34 began taking on water and the crew put on life jackets as they feared the boat might sink. However the team sailed well and won the Citizen Cup and the right to defend the America's Cup. Dennis Conner led a team that included helmsman Paul Cayard.

PACT 95
PACT 95 was based in Maine, founded by Kevin Mahaney and managed by John Marshall. The team developed Young America (USA–36) which, despite being badly damaged twice, finished the Citizen Cup with the best record of 24-12. However they lost to Team Dennis Conner in the final. Young America was used by Team Dennis Conner as they unsuccessfully attempted to defend the America's Cup.

The crew included Mahaney, Robert Hopkins, John Kostecki, Matt Welling, Andreas Josenhans and Ken Read.

Round robin
One point was awarded for a win in Round Robin one, two for RR2, four for RR3 and 7 for a win in RR4. Young America took two bonus points into the semifinals and Stars & Stripes took one bonus point.

Semi-finals
After a compromise was reached by the three syndicates, all three advanced into the finals. Young America took two bonus points into the final and Mighty Mary took one bonus point.

Finals
Stars & Stripes overcame a large deficit to Mighty Mary to win the Citizen Cup.  Judging that the yacht Young America was the fastest of the regatta, however, the Team Dennis Conner syndicate petitioned and was granted the right to sail Young America in place of Stars & Stripes in an unsuccessful attempt to defend the succeeding 1995 America's Cup against New Zealand's Black Magic.

References

External links
America's Cup Official Website for the 32nd America's Cup in Valencia
CupInfo.com America's Cup News and Information for 2007

Citizen Cup
Citizen Cup
Citizen Cup
Citizen Cup
Sailing competitions in the United States
Citizen Cup